The Dark Side of the Sun is a novel by Terry Pratchett.

The Dark Side of the Sun may also refer to:

The Dark Side of the Sun (film), a 1988 Yugoslavian film starring Brad Pitt
The Dark Side of the Sun (TV serial), a BBC television serial
"The Dark Side of the Sun" (Space: Above and Beyond episode), an episode from the science fiction TV show Space: Above and Beyond
"Darkside of the Sun", a song by Tokio Hotel, from the 2009 album Humanoid